Huia Jahnke, sometimes known as Huia Tomlins-Jahnke, is a New Zealand academic. She is Māori, of Ngāti Kahungunu, Ngāti Toa Rangātira, Ngāi Tahu and Ngāti Hine descent and as of 2018 is a full professor of Māori and indigenous education at Massey University.

After a master's degree in education and a PhD at Massey University she joined the staff and rose to full professor and head of the school of education.

Jahnke is married to Bob Jahnke, a professor in the art faculty at Massey.

Selected works 
 Tomlins-Jahnke, Huia, and Julia Taiapa. "Maori research." Social science research in New Zealand: Many paths to understanding (1999): 39–50.
 Tomlins-Jahnke, Huia. "Towards a secure identity: Maori women and the home-place." In Women's Studies International Forum, vol. 25, no. 5, pp. 503–513. Pergamon, 2002.
 Tomlins-Jahnke, Huia, and Annemarie Gillies. "Indigenous innovations in qualitative research method: Investigating the private world of family life." International Journal of Qualitative Methods 11, no. 4 (2012): 498–512.
 Tomlins-Jahnke, Huia. "Towards a theory of mana wahine." He Pukenga Korero 3, no. 1 (2013).
 Tomlins-Jahnke, Huia, "The place of cultural standards in indigenous education." MAI Review LW 1, no. 1 (2008): 11.

References

External links
 

Living people
Year of birth missing (living people)
New Zealand women academics
Massey University alumni
Academic staff of the Massey University
Ngāti Kahungunu people
New Zealand women writers
New Zealand Māori women academics